Desmond John Smyth (born 12 February 1953) is an Irish professional golfer. He won eight times on the European Tour between 1979 and 2001. He also had a successful senior career winning twice on the PGA Tour Champions and five times on the European Senior Tour between 2005 and 2012. He played in two Ryder Cup matches, 1979 and 1981.

Professional career
Smyth turned professional in 1974 and was a member of the European Tour for over a quarter of a century. His best finish on the European Tour Order of Merit was seventh in 1988. He won eight tournaments on the tour across four different decades, breaking Neil Coles' record as the oldest man to win a European Tour event when he claimed the 2001 Madeira Island Open at the age of 48 years and 34 days. This record was broken by Miguel Ángel Jiménez (48 years, 11 months, 13 days) at the 2012 UBS Hong Kong Open.

Smyth represented Europe in the Ryder Cup in 1979 and 1981, losing on both occasions to the United States. Smyth also represented his country in the World Cup and the Alfred Dunhill Cup many times and was a member of the Irish team (alongside Eamonn Darcy and Ronan Rafferty) which won the latter in 1988. At the 2006 Ryder Cup, he was one of Ian Woosnam's vice-captains.

After turning fifty in 2003, Smyth had a successful career in senior golf, winning tournaments on both the Champions Tour and the European Senior Tour.

Smyth is the only golfer to win European Tour events in 4 different decades.

Personal life 
Smyth has a son, Greg, a horticultural student at IT Blanchardstown. Greg won Ireland's eighth largest lottery jackpot of €9,426,636 on 13 August 2008.

Amateur wins
1973 West of Ireland Amateur Open Championship

Professional wins (26)

European Tour wins (8)

European Tour playoff record (2–3)

Other wins (9)
1979 Irish National PGA Championship
1980 Irish Dunlop Tournament, Carroll's Irish Match Play Championship
1985 Irish National PGA Championship
1986 Irish National PGA Championship
1990 Irish National PGA Championship
1995 Glen Dimplex Irish International Match Play Championship
1996 Irish National PGA Championship
2001 Irish National PGA Championship

Champions Tour wins (2)

Champions Tour playoff record (0–1)

European Senior Tour wins (5)

European Senior Tour playoff record (0–2)

Other senior wins (2)
2011 Liberty Mutual Legends of Golf – Raphael Division (with Mark James)
2012 Liberty Mutual Legends of Golf – Raphael Division (with Mark James)

Results in major championships

Note: Smyth only played in The Open Championship.

CUT = missed the half-way cut (3rd round cut in 1977, 1980 and 1985 Open Championships)
DQ = Disqualified
"T" = tied

Team appearances
Amateur
European Amateur Team Championship (representing Ireland): 1973

Professional
Ryder Cup (representing Europe): 1979, 1981
World Cup (representing Ireland): 1979, 1980, 1982, 1988, 1989
Hennessy Cognac Cup (representing Great Britain and Ireland): 1980 (winners), 1982 (winners), (representing Ireland) 1984
Alfred Dunhill Cup (representing Ireland): 1985, 1986, 1987, 1988 (winners), 2000
UBS Cup (representing the Rest of the World): 2001, 2003 (tie)

See also
List of golfers with most European Tour wins

References

External links

Irish male golfers
European Tour golfers
European Senior Tour golfers
PGA Tour Champions golfers
Ryder Cup competitors for Europe
RTÉ Sports Person of the Year winners
People from Drogheda
1953 births
Living people